Łubnica  (German: Bienenwerder) is a village in the administrative district of Gmina Gryfino, within Gryfino County, West Pomeranian Voivodeship, in north-western Poland, close to the German border.

The village has a population of 40.

See also
History of Pomerania

References

Villages in Gryfino County